Anatoliy Andriyovych Ulyanov (born 26 July 1998) is a Ukrainian professional football defender who plays for Kremin Kremenchuk.

Career
Ulyanov is a product of the Youth Sportive School Ternopil, BRW-VIK Volodymyr-Volynskyi and Metalurh Donetsk youth sportive team systems.

After dissolution of Metalurh Donetsk in 2015, he was signed by FC Stal Kamianske and made his debut for main-squad FC Stal in the game against FC Dynamo Kyiv on 26 November 2017 in the Ukrainian Premier League.

References

External links
Profile at FFU Official Site (Ukr)

1998 births
Living people
Sportspeople from Ternopil
Ukrainian footballers
Ukrainian Premier League players
FC Stal Kamianske players
FC Kalush players
FC Volyn Lutsk players
FC Nyva Ternopil players
FC Prykarpattia Ivano-Frankivsk (1998) players
MFC Mykolaiv players
Association football defenders